Deserters Island is an island in the Deserters Group archipelago in the Queen Charlotte Strait region of the Central Coast of British Columbia, Canada. Mahpahkum Indian Reserve No. 4 is located on the northwest end of the island.

The name refers to the crew of the HBC vessel Norman Morrison who deserted that vessel and were killed on these islands by natives sent out to find and capture them.  Wishart Island in this group, and the Wishart Peninsula on Broughton Island are named for James Wishart, one of the deserters. An A. Willoughby was another deserter, a group of rocks in the middle of the strait to the northeast of the Deserters Group bear his name.

See also
Deserter (disambiguation)

References

Central Coast of British Columbia
Islands of British Columbia